Headspace Guide to Sleep is a 2021 animated docuseries created for Netflix in collaboration with Headspace. The seven-part series explores the science behind getting healthy sleep and provides advice on how to do so. Each episode ends with a guided relaxation to help prepare you for sleep. It was released on April 28, 2021.

References

External links 

Netflix original documentary television series
English-language Netflix original programming
2020s American animated television series
2020s American documentary television series